Crime Team was a British television series which ran for nine episodes between 2001 and 2003. It originally aired on Channel 4 and was hosted by practicing Queen's Counsel lawyer Jerome Lynch. The premise of the show was that two celebrity guests were presented with historical murders, and were given three days to solve the mystery based on the evidence available. Lynch guided them through the investigation and provided the historical and legal context of the crime for the audience. Crime scenes were reconstructed for the investigators and some aspects were re-enacted for the audience. Scientific experts assisted in presenting forensic evidence.

Series
A one-off pilot was produced in 2001 in which private detective Noel Hogan, investigative journalist Yasmin Pasha and a crime writer Frances Fyfield were given four days to solve a series of 19th century murders. It was broadcast on 22 April of that year. Soon after, a series of 8 episodes was commissioned in 2002. The show was not renewed.

Episodes

References

External links
 

2001 British television series debuts
2003 British television series endings
Channel 4 documentary series
British crime television series
English-language television shows